Communication Breakdown is a 2004 independent motion picture directed by Richard O'Sullivan, who also wrote the script along with the film's star, Dan Lashley, and produced by John Edmonds Kozma (producer of  Nick Cassavetes' Kentucky Rhapsody").

The movie also stars Willie Repoley, Meredith Sause, Aleks West, Blair Peery, Brian Heffron, Jasmin St. Claire, Katie Lester, Satu Rautaharju, and Aubrey Goss.

References

2004 films
2004 comedy films
American comedy films
2000s English-language films
2000s American films